Lawn Manor Academy is a secondary school with academy status in Walcot, Swindon, Wiltshire, England. Its site is next to The Lawn, a public park which was the grounds of a manor house, home of the Goddard family.

The first school on this site was Lawn School, which opened in 1964. In 1965, education in Swindon was reorganised and the secondary schools became comprehensive; around this time the school's name was changed to Churchfields School.

In 2000 Ofsted judged the school to have serious weaknesses and put it in the category of requiring special measures to improve. In 2004 the school was judged to have improved to Good.

In September 2011 it became Churchfields Academy.

In May 2017 the school joined the Royal Wootton Bassett Academy Trust, and from September of that year its name became Lawn Manor Academy.

References

External links

Academies in Swindon
Secondary schools in Swindon